Jixi Xingkaihu Airport  is an airport serving Jixi, a city in Heilongjiang Province, China.  It is located 18 kilometers from the city center in Jidong County near the Russian border, and is named after Khanka Lake (Xingkaihu in Chinese).  The airport cost 262 million yuan to build and was opened in October 2009. 

The Jixi Xingkaihu Airport replaces the old Jixi Pingyang Airport (鸡西平阳机场) that was built in the 1930s.

Airlines and destinations

See also
List of airports in China
List of the busiest airports in China

References

Airports in Heilongjiang
Airports established in 2009
2009 establishments in China